Lotte van Beek (born 9 December 1991) is a retired Dutch speed skater.

She finished second on the women's 1500 metres event at the 2013 World Single Distance Championships. At the 2014 Winter Olympics, she was part of the Dutch team who won a gold medal on the women team pursuit; she also won a bronze medal on the women's 1500 metres. At the 2018 European Single Distance Speed Skating Championships, she won a gold medal on the women's 1500 metres and another with the Dutch women pursuit team.

At the 2018 Winter Olympics, she was part of the Dutch women pursuit team who won a silver medal.

Records

Personal records

References

1991 births
Dutch female speed skaters
Speed skaters at the 2014 Winter Olympics
Speed skaters at the 2018 Winter Olympics
Olympic speed skaters of the Netherlands
Sportspeople from Zwolle
Living people
Medalists at the 2014 Winter Olympics
Medalists at the 2018 Winter Olympics
Olympic medalists in speed skating
Olympic gold medalists for the Netherlands
Olympic silver medalists for the Netherlands
Olympic bronze medalists for the Netherlands
World Single Distances Speed Skating Championships medalists
21st-century Dutch women